Brad Howard (born 21 December 1987) is an Australian rules footballer who played for the St Kilda Football Club in the Australian Football League (AFL).

AFL career 
Howard, from Toowoomba, was drafted by St Kilda with their second pick in the 2006 AFL Draft and made his debut for the club in Round 8 of the 2007 season. The Saints, decimated by injuries at the time, were forced to select Howard, although he had shown promising form in the Victorian Football League.
Howard now plays for Redland Bombers in the NEAFL (North East Australian Football League), floating across Half Back. He also works for the NEAFL in the Operations department.

References

External links

Living people
Australian rules footballers from Queensland
St Kilda Football Club players
Redland Football Club players
1987 births